The year 1962 in architecture involved some significant architectural events and new buildings.

Events
 Construction of Dalgety Bay, a small New town in Fife, Scotland, begins.

Buildings and structures

Buildings opened

 April 21 – The Space Needle in Seattle, just in time for the Century 21 Exposition.
 May 25 – Coventry Cathedral in England, designed by Basil Spence, is consecrated.
 May 28 – TWA Flight Center at JFK Airport, New York, designed by Eero Saarinen.
 July 1 – The Minolta Tower in Niagara Falls.
 August 24 – General Rafael Urdaneta Bridge over Lake Maracaibo, Venezuela, designed by Riccardo Morandi; opened by President Romulo Betancourt.
 September 23 – Philharmonic Hall, Lincoln Center for the Performing Arts, New York City, designed by Max Abramovitz.
 November 6 – Commonwealth Institute in the London Borough of Kensington, designed by Sir Robert Matthew of RMJM; opened by Queen Elizabeth II (refurbished 2016 as the Design Museum).
 dates unknown
 St George's Church, Rugby, Warwickshire, England, designed by Denys Hinton, is consecrated.
 Saint Petersburg TV Tower in Saint Petersburg, Russia.
 KPN-Zendmast Waalhaven in Rotterdam, Netherlands.

Buildings completed
 Both Marina City towers in Chicago, United States, are completed; however, they are not fully furnished until 1964.
 Tour CIBC in Montreal, Quebec, Canada.
 Place Ville Marie in Montreal, Quebec, Canada, becoming the tallest building in the British Commonwealth (1962–1964).
 CIS Tower in Manchester, England, designed by G. S. Hay and Gordon Tait, becoming the tallest building in the United Kingdom (1962–1963).
 Tryvannstårnet, broadcasting tower in Oslo, Norway.
 Sentech Tower, television transmitter in Johannesburg, South Africa (transmissions began in 1961).
 Policromatic condominium block in Zagreb by Ivo Vitic.
 United States Air Force Academy Cadet Chapel, Colorado Springs, designed by Walter Netsch.
 Tukal, on Beaulieu River in Hampshire, England, house designed for himself by Seymour Harris.

Awards
 AIA Gold Medal – Eero Saarinen (posthumous).
 Architecture Firm Award – Skidmore, Owings & Merrill.
 Grand Prix de Rome, architecture – Piet Blom.
 RAIA Gold Medal – Joseph Fowell.
 RIBA Royal Gold Medal – Sven Gottfried Markelius.

Births
 February 25 – Andres Siim, Estonian architect

Deaths
 January 16 – Ivan Meštrović, Croatian sculptor and architect (born 1883)
 April 21 – W. Gray Young, New Zealand architect (born 1885)
 May 14 – Dov Karmi, Israeli architect (born 1905)
 August 18 – Max Fabiani, Slovene-Italian architect (born 1865)
 September 23 – Louis de Soissons, Canadian-born English architect (born 1890)
 December 28 – Karl Völker, German architect and painter (born 1889)

References

 
20th-century architecture